The Khushuu Tsaidam Museum is a Mongolian museum dedicated to the Orkhon inscriptions, located in the Kharkhorin.

The Bilge Qaghan and Kul Tigin monuments were found in the Orkhon Valley Cultural Landscape UNESCO world heritage site 47 km to the northwest of here. 

The museum was built in cooperation with Turkish Cooperation and Coordination Agency in 2008. For better preservation of the monuments, they were brought to the museum, and copies of them were erected on the places where they were originally found.

References 

Övörkhangai Province
Archaeological sites in Mongolia
Museums in Mongolia